is a Japanese multimedia franchise  by Level-5. An action role-playing video game was released in Japan for the Nintendo Switch, PlayStation 4 and PlayStation 5, in November 2021. An anime series by OLM, aired from October to December 2021, which was followed by a second season in October 2022.

Megaton Musashi Wired, an updated version of the game with original and new content, is being developed and released for the Japanese and overseas markets for the Switch, PS4 and PS5.

Plot 
In the near future, 99.9% of humanity was nearly wiped out by an unknown alien race known as "Dracters", which have drilled a hole through the planet and terra-forming Earth into a more suitable place for its species. This forces the surviving 1% of mankind to seek refuge in heavily-fortified shelters and having their memories of the invasion repressed, allowing the unknowing survivors to live in peace while the unified world government and its forces tries to fight back against the Dracters using armored mechs known as "Rogues", seemingly with no avail.

Yamato Ichidaiji, a hot-blooded and psychopathic teenager who recently beginning to experience horrifying flashbacks of the Dracter's invasion and the resulting death of his family, was chosen to be one of the pilots for the newly-developed Megaton-Class Rogues, alongside other chosen teens: Teru Asami, a calm-headed, yet narcissistic teen who has prominent ties with the unified government; Ryugo Hijikata, a brawl-happy delinquent; Reiji Amemiya, a cat-loving pacifist; and Jun Kirishima, a feisty and talented girl. Vowing vengeance on the Dracters, Yamato, along with Teru and Ryugo, pilots a special three-component Megaton-Class Rogue known as "Musashi" as he and the other chosen pilots fought a secret war that will decide the fate of Earth and what remains of humanity, which became even more complicated as Yamato crosses paths with a runaway Dracter princess named Arshem Laia, who strives for her people to peacefully co-exist with mankind.

The Rogues
In an effort to protect mankind and hopefully turn the tide of war against the Dracters to their favor, the united world government have built armored bipedal machines known as "Rogues" to protect the heavily-fortified shelters made to house the last of humanity. Designed to be mass-produced and deployed in large numbers, the Rogues, while less durable, are capable of taking enough punishment before breaking down. Nowadays, the regular Rogues are used as cannon-fodder for their more advanced successors.

Sometime later, development on a series of next-generation Rogues aboard the Shelter Ixia was reportedly finished and was later dubbed "Megaton-Class Rogues". These Megaton-Class Rogues are made from a special type of metal called "Megatonium", which was said to be stronger than any known metal ever known to man, making these type of Rogues more powerful and durable.

Musashi
The titular mecha of the series, named after Miyamoto Musashi, primarily piloted by Yamato Ichidaiji, though Terui and Ryugo occasionally operates the Rogue prior to getting the Sparkman and the Gaudia. Being the "jack-of-all-traits" amongst Megaton-Class Rogues, Musashi uses its twin swords to cleave through numerous enemies with relative ease, as well as firing a powerful beam from the Diffusion Cannon in its torso, obliterating anything unlucky enough to be caught in the blast. Unlike most Rogues, the Musashi comprised three separate components, the Upper Torso, the Arms and the Lower Torso, which must be assemble together on higher altitudes via the Sky Build (スカイビルド, Sukaibirudo) formation.
Arthur
Inspired by the heroics of legendary King Arthur, this Megaton-Class Rogue excels in close-quarters combat using its sword, as well as possessing a centaur-like lower body, enabling greater mobility and agility amongst other Megaton-Class Rogues. Primarily piloted by Reiji Amemiya.
Maximus
The range-focused fighter amongst the Megaton-Class Rogue, the Maximus utilizes the many missile pods in its body to fire an endless salvo of heat-seeking missiles to wipe out multiple targets at once. Inspired by the Pontifex maximus. Primarily piloted by Jun Kirishima, with Momoka Saotome serving as the co-pilot.
Sparkman
Inspired by Thomas Edison, the Sparkman is able to make use of the electricity it constantly generates, either to augment the destructive potential of whatever weapon the Rogue is holding, or by harnessing its raw power to amplify its attacks through a variety of ways. Primarily piloted by Teru Asami.
Gaudia
The physically strongest out of all the Megaton-Class Rogues. Inspired by the brave warriors of ancient Rome, it utilizes the raw strength to crush its oppositions through sheer might alone, as well as using its large body to shrug off any blunt hits. Primarily piloted by Ryugo Hijikata.

Characters

Media

Video game
The project was originally announced on July 27, 2016, and set to begin in Q3 2017. Developed and published by Level-5 and directed by Akihiro Hino, the game released in Japan on November 11, 2021, for the Nintendo Switch and PlayStation 4. Following the game's release, it has received free updates with additional content. Paid downloadable content (DLC) was released throughout 2022.

As of March 2023, the game has included collaboration with various anime robot properties including Mazinger Z, UFO Robot Grendizer, Getter Robo, Combattler V, and Voltes V.

Anime
The anime television series for the franchise was announced along with the game. The series was produced by OLM and directed by Akihiro Hino (chief) and Shigeharu Takahashi, with scripts also written by Hino, character designs by Takuzō Nagano, and music composed by Ken'ichirō Saigō. The series premiered on Tokyo MX and BS Fuji on October 1, 2021. The series' theme song is "Musashi", performed by Zuma.

The second season premiered on October 7, 2022. The theme song is "Eiyū no Uta", performed by Kodai Matsūra.

Some of the episodes have been delayed with the final five episodes due to air in February 2023.

Reception
In its first three days of release, the game sold 11,378 units, with 7,730 being sold on the Nintendo Switch and 3,648 on the PlayStation 4.

References

External links
  
 

2021 video games
Anime postponed due to the COVID-19 pandemic
Level-5 (company) franchises
Mass media franchises
Mass media franchises introduced in 2021
Mecha anime and manga
Nintendo Switch games
OLM, Inc.
PlayStation 4 games
PlayStation 5 games
Television series impacted by the COVID-19 pandemic
Tokyo MX original programming
Video games about mecha
Video games developed in Japan
Video games related to anime and manga
Windows games